Victor is an unincorporated community in Fayette County, West Virginia, United States. Victor has a post office with ZIP code 25938.

References

Unincorporated communities in Fayette County, West Virginia
Unincorporated communities in West Virginia